Daníel Leó Grétarsson Schmidt (born 2 October 1995) is an Icelandic professional footballer who plays as a defender for Śląsk Wrocław and the Iceland national team. He has previously played for Grindavík, Aalesund and Blackpool.

Career

Club
On 12 November 2014, Daníel signed a three-year contract with Norwegian Tippeligaen side Aalesunds FK.

On 5 October 2020, Daníel joined Blackpool in the English Football League for an undisclosed fee.

Daníel signed for Śląsk Wrocław on 27 January 2022 for an undisclosed fee.

International
Daníel has represented Iceland at U-19 and U-21 level.

He was called up to the senior team for the first time in September 2019 when he joined the squad for the Euro 2020 qualifiers against Moldova and Albania.

Career statistics

Club

References

External links
 
 
 

Living people
1995 births
Daniel Leo Gretarsson
Daniel Leo Gretarsson
Daniel Leo Gretarsson
Association football midfielders
Daniel Leo Gretarsson
Aalesunds FK players
Blackpool F.C. players
Śląsk Wrocław players
Daniel Leo Gretarsson
Daniel Leo Gretarsson
Eliteserien players
Norwegian First Division players
English Football League players
Ekstraklasa players
Daniel Leo Gretarsson
Expatriate footballers in Norway
Daniel Leo Gretarsson
Expatriate footballers in Poland
Icelandic expatriate sportspeople in Poland
People from Keflavík
Iceland international footballers